The 21st Canadian Parliament was in session from September 15, 1949, until June 13, 1953.  The membership was set by the 1949 federal election on June 27, 1949, and it changed only somewhat due to resignations and by-elections until it was dissolved prior to the 1953 election.

It was controlled by a Liberal Party majority under Prime Minister Louis St. Laurent and the 17th Canadian Ministry.  The Official Opposition was the Progressive Conservative Party, led by George Drew.

The Speaker was William Ross Macdonald.  See also List of Canadian electoral districts 1947-1952 for a list of the ridings in this parliament.

List of members

Following is a full list of members of the twenty-first Parliament listed first by province, then by electoral district.

Electoral districts denoted by an asterisk (*) indicates that district was represented by two members.

Alberta

British Columbia

Manitoba

New Brunswick

Newfoundland

Northwest Territories

Nova Scotia

Ontario

Prince Edward Island

Quebec

Saskatchewan

By-elections

Notes

References

Succession

Canadian parliaments
1949 establishments in Canada
1953 disestablishments in Canada
1949 in Canada
1950 in Canada
1951 in Canada
1952 in Canada
1953 in Canada